This is a list of awards and nominations received by The Smashing Pumpkins.

American Music Awards
The American Music Award is an annual American music awards show, created by Dick Clark in 1973 for ABC when the network's contract to present the Grammy Awards expired.

|-
| rowspan="2" | 1997 || rowspan="2" | The Smashing Pumpkins || Favorite Alternative Artist || 
|-
| Favorite Heavy Metal/Hard Rock Artist || 
|}

Antville Music Video Awards
The Antville Music Video Awards are online awards for the best music video and music video directors of the year. They were first awarded in 2005. 

|-
| 2007
| "Tarantula"
| Worst Video 
|

Brit Awards
The Brit Awards are the British Phonographic Industry's annual pop music awards.

|-
| 1997 || The Smashing Pumpkins || International Group || 
|}

D&AD Awards
Design and Art Direction (D&AD) is a British educational charity which exists to promote excellence in design and advertising. 

|-
| rowspan=2|1997
| rowspan=2|"1979"
| Cinematography
| style="background:#8a8b89"| Graphite Pencil
|-
| Direction
| style="background:#8a8b89"| Graphite Pencil

Danish Music Awards
The Danish Music Awards (DMA) is a Danish award show. The show has been arranged by IFPI since 1989, and was originally called IFPI-prisen ("IFPI-Award") until 1991, when it changed its name to Dansk Grammy ("Danish Grammy"). The current name was given in 2001, after the American Grammy Awards registered the name Grammy as their trademark. In 2011 IFPI joined with TV2 (Denmark) and KODA to present the awards ceremony.

!Ref.
|-
| 1999
| Adore
| Best International Album
| 
|

GAFFA-Prisen Awards 
Delivered since 1991. The GAFFA Awards (Danish: GAFFA Prisen) are a Danish award that rewards popular music, awarded by the GAFFA magazine.

|-
| 1995
| Mellon Collie and the Infinite Sadness
| rowspan=2|Best Foreign Album
| 
|-
| rowspan=5|1998
| Adore
| 
|-
| "Ava Adore"
| Best Foreign Hit
| 
|-
| Billy Corgan
| Best Foreign Male Act
| 
|-
| rowspan=3|The Smashing Pumpkins
| Best Foreign Live Act
|
|-
| rowspan=2|Best Foreign Band
| 
|-
| rowspan=2|2019
| 
|-
| Shiny and Oh So Bright, Vol. 1 / LP: No Past. No Future. No Sun.
| rowspan=2|Best Foreign Album
| 
|-
| rowspan=2|2021
| Cyr
| 
|-
| The Smashing Pumpkins
| Best Foreign Band
|

Grammy Awards 
The Grammy Award is an honor awarded by The Recording Academy to recognize outstanding achievement in the mainly English-language music industry. The Smashing Pumpkins have received eleven nominations and winning two times in the Best Hard Rock Performance category.

|-
| rowspan="2" | 1994 || "Cherub Rock" || Best Hard Rock Performance || 
|-
| Siamese Dream || Best Alternative Music Album || 
|-
| rowspan="7" | 1997 || rowspan="2" | Mellon Collie and the Infinite Sadness || Album of the Year || 
|-
| Best Alternative Music Album || 
|-
| rowspan="2" | "1979" || Record of the Year || 
|-
| Best Rock Performance by a Duo or Group with Vocal || 
|-
| "Mellon Collie and the Infinite Sadness" || Best Pop Instrumental Performance || 
|-
| "Bullet with Butterfly Wings" || Best Hard Rock Performance || 
|-
| "Tonight, Tonight" || Best Music Video || 
|-
| 1998 || "The End Is the Beginning Is the End" || Best Hard Rock Performance || 
|-
| 1999 || Adore || Best Alternative Music Album || 
|-
| 2001 || Machina/The Machines of God || Best Recording Package || 
|}

Juno Awards
The Juno Award are presented annually to Canadians musical artists and bands to acknowledge their artistic and technical achievements in all aspects of music.

|-
| 1997 || Mellon Collie and the Infinite Sadness || International Album of the Year || 
|}

Lunas del Auditorio
Lunas del Auditorio are sponsored by The National Auditorium in Mexico to honor the best live shows in the country.

|-
| 2008
| The Smashing Pumpkins  
| Best Foreign Rock Artist 
|

MTV Europe Music Awards
The MTV Europe Music Awards are an event presented by Viacom International Media Networks Europe which awards prizes to musicians and performers.

|-
| rowspan="2" | 1996 || rowspan="2" | The Smashing Pumpkins || Best Group || 
|-
| Best Rock || 
|-
| 1998 || The Smashing Pumpkins || Best Rock || 
|}

MTV Video Music Awards
The MTV Video Music Award is an award presented by the cable channel MTV to honor the best in the music video medium. The Smashing Pumpkins have received fifteen nominations and seven wins.

|-
| rowspan="2" | 1994 || rowspan="2" | "Disarm" || Best Alternative Video || 
|-
| Best Editing || 
|-
| rowspan="9" | 1996 || rowspan="8" | "Tonight, Tonight" || Video of the Year || 
|-
| Breakthrough Video || 
|-
| Best Direction || 
|-
| Best Visual Effects || 
|-
| Best Art Direction || 
|-
| Best Editing || 
|-
| Best Cinematography || 
|-
| Viewer's Choice || 
|-
| "1979" || Best Alternative Video || 
|-
| rowspan="4" | 1997 || rowspan="4" | "The End Is the Beginning Is the End" || Best Direction || 
|-
| Best Visual Effects || 
|-
| Best Editing || 
|-
| Best Cinematography || 
|-
| 1999 || The Smashing Pumpkins Website || Best Artist Website || 
|}

Music Video Production Awards
The MVPA Awards are annually presented by a Los Angeles-based music trade organization to honor the year's best music videos.

|-
| 1999
| "Ava Adore"
| Video of the Year
| 
|-
| 2006
| The Smashing Pumpkins
| Kratz Award for Creative Excellence
| 
|-
| 2008
| "That's the Way (My Love Is)"
| Best Computer Effects 
|

NME Awards

The NME Awards were created by the NME magazine and was first held in 1953. The Smashing Pumpkins has received two nominations.

|-
| 1999
| Adore
| Best Album
| 
|-
| 2013
| Mellon Collie and the Infinite Sadness
| rowspan="2" | Best Reissue
| 
|-
| 2015
| Adore
|

Polstar Concert Industry Awards
The Pollstar Concert Industry Awards aim to reward the best in the business of shows and concerts. 

|-
| 1992
| Themselves
| Best New Rock Artist 
| 
|- 
| 1994
| Tour 
| Club Tour of the Year 
| 
|-
| 1997
| Tour 
| Major Tour of the Year 
|

VH1 Fashion Awards

!Ref.
|-
| 2000
| "Stand Inside Your Love"
| Visionary Award
| 
|

Žebřík Music Awards

!Ref.
|-
| rowspan=5|1998
| Themselves
| Best International Group
| 
| rowspan=6|
|-
| rowspan=2|Billy Corgan
| Best International Male
| 
|-
| Best International Personality
| 
|-
| rowspan=2|"Ava Adore"
| Best International Song
| 
|-
| Best International Video
| 
|-
| 1999
| Disintegration of Smashing Pumpkins
| International Průser
| 
|-
| 2007
| Themselves
| Best International Group
| 
|

Hottest 100 of all time 

In July Triple J Hottest 100 of All Time, 2009 the Smashing Pumpkins had 3 songs in Triple J Hottest 100 of all time, #35 "1979", #51 "Bullet With Butterfly Wings" and #78 "Today", voted by the Australian public.

References

Awards
Smashing Pumpkins, The